The Divine Praises or Laudes Divinae informally known as Blessed be God is an 18th-century Roman Catholic expiatory prayer. It is traditionally recited during Benediction of the Blessed Sacrament.  It may also be said after having heard, seen or inadvertently uttered profanity or blasphemy.



History
The Divine Praises were originally written in Italian by Luigi Felici in 1797 for the purpose of making reparation after saying or hearing sacrilege or blasphemy.  The praises were later expanded by Pope Pius VII in 1801 and eventually came to be a recitation following the Benediction, usually with the priest saying each line (depends), which is then repeated by the congregation.

Text of the prayer

Notes

Roman Catholic prayers